The STK 40 GL, formerly the CIS 40 GL is a 40 mm grenade launcher, developed in the late 1980s and produced by the Singaporean defense firm CIS - Chartered Industries of Singapore (currently ST Kinetics). The launcher is employed primarily by the Singapore Armed Forces and the police and security forces of several other countries.

Design
According to ST Kinetics Senior Engineer Felix Tsai, the STK 40 GL can be configured to be used with a buttstock or attached underneath assault rifles like the SAR-21, the M16 and HK series.

Users

 : 601st Special Forces Group uses it on Samopal vz. 58s.
 : Made under license by Luigi Franchi S.p.A. as the Franchi GLF-40.
 : Used by the Royal Papua New Guinea Constabulary.
 
 : Used during Cenepa war 1995.

Non-state actors
 Secretly acquired by Tamil Tigers.

Notes

References

Bibliography

External links
Official Site

40×46mm grenade launchers
Grenade launchers of Singapore